Rabdion is a genus of snakes of the family Colubridae.

Species
The genus Rhabdion contains the following two valid species.
Rabdion forsteni 
Rabdion grovesi

References

Further reading
Boulenger GA (1894). Catalogue of the Snakes in the British Museum (Natural History). Volume II., Containing the Conclusion of the Colubridæ Aglyphæ. London: Trustees of the British Museum (Natural History). (Taylor and Francis, printers). xi + 382 pp. + Plates I-XX. (Genus Rhabdophidium, replacement name, p. 328).
Duméril AMC (1853). "Prodrome de la classification des reptiles ophidiens ". Mémoires de l'Académie des Sciences de l'Institut de France, Paris 23: 399-536 + Plates I-II. (Rabdion, new genus, p. 441). (in French).

Rabdion
Snake genera
Taxa named by André Marie Constant Duméril